Oligostomis is a genus of giant casemakers in the family Phryganeidae. There are at least four described species in Oligostomis.

Species
These four species belong to the genus Oligostomis:
 Oligostomis ocelligera (Walker, 1852)
 Oligostomis pardalis (Walker, 1852)
 Oligostomis reticulata (Linnaeus, 1761)
 Oligostomis soochowica (Ulmer, 1932)

References

Further reading

External links

 

Trichoptera genera
Articles created by Qbugbot